The 1917 Clemson Tigers football team represented Clemson Agricultural College—now known as Clemson University—during the 1917 Southern Intercollegiate Athletic Association football season. Under first-year head coach Edward Donahue, the team posted an overall record of 6–2 with a mark of 5–1 in SIAA play. F. L. Witsel was the team captain.

Stumpy Banks scored five touchdowns against Furman, setting a school record. John Heisman ranked Clemson fourth in the south, or third in the Southern Intercollegiate Athletic Association.

Schedule

References

Bibliography
 

Clemson
Clemson Tigers football seasons
Clemson Tigers football